The 2022 Alabama Attorney General election took place on November 8, 2022, to elect the Attorney General of Alabama. Incumbent Republican Attorney General Steve Marshall won re-election to a second term.

Republican primary

Candidates

Nominee
Steve Marshall, incumbent attorney general (2017–present)

Eliminated in primary
Harry Bartlett Still III, attorney and former county manager

Primary results

Endorsements

Democratic primary

Candidates

Nominee
Wendell Major, police chief of Tarrant, Alabama (2021–present)

General election

Predictions

Endorsements

Results

See also
Attorney General of Alabama
2022 United States attorney general elections
2022 United States House of Representatives elections in Alabama
2022 Alabama gubernatorial election
2022 Alabama lieutenant gubernatorial election
2022 Alabama Senate election
2022 Alabama House of Representatives election
2022 Alabama elections

References

Attorney General
Alabama
Alabama Attorney General elections